The 2018 Shymkent Challenger was a professional tennis tournament played on clay courts. It was the second edition of the tournament which was part of the 2018 ATP Challenger Tour. It took place in Shymkent, Kazakhstan between 4 and 9 June 2018.

Singles main-draw entrants

Seeds

 1 Rankings are as of 28 May 2018.

Other entrants
The following players received wildcards into the singles main draw:
  Alen Avidzba
  Roman Khassanov
  Grigoriy Lomakin
  Denis Yevseyev

The following players received entry from the qualifying draw:
  Kevin Krawietz
  Daniel Masur
  Jurij Rodionov
  Wu Tung-lin

Champions

Singles

 Yannick Hanfmann def.  Roberto Cid Subervi 7–6(7–3), 4–6, 6–2.

Doubles

 Lorenzo Giustino /  Gonçalo Oliveira def.  Lucas Miedler /  Sebastian Ofner 6–2, 7–6(7–4).

References

2018 ATP Challenger Tour
2018